Kot Daya Kishan railway station is  located in  Pakistan near Chak 236 GB Kilanwala tehsil Jaranwala on Shorkot–Sheikhupura Branch Line

This station is closed nowadays. This station was constructed between 1906 to 1911.

See also
 List of railway stations in Pakistan
 Pakistan Railways
 Chak 236 GB Kilanwala

References

External links

Railway stations in Faisalabad District